Dalia Muccioli (born 22 May 1993) is an Italian former racing cyclist, who rode professionally between 2012 and 2019, for the ,  and  teams. She competed in the 2013 UCI women's team time trial in Florence, and won the Italian National Road Race Championships in the same year.

Following her retirement, Muccioli now works as a tour guide for a cycling tours and adventure company.

Major results
Source: 

2012
 10th Overall La Route de France
2013
 1st  Road race, National Road Championships
 1st Stage 1a (TTT) Giro del Trentino Alto Adige-Südtirol
 8th Road race, UEC European Under-23 Road Championships
2014
 4th Giro dell'Emilia Internazionale Donne Elite
 8th Overall Gracia-Orlová
 10th Overall Vuelta a El Salvador
1st  Young rider classification
2015
 3rd Road race, National Road Championships
2018
 4th Overall Tour of Chongming Island

See also
 2014 Astana BePink Women's Team season

References

External links
 

1993 births
Living people
Italian female cyclists
People from Cesenatico
Cyclists from Emilia-Romagna
Sportspeople from the Province of Forlì-Cesena